Kelseyville is a census-designated place (CDP) in Lake County, California, United States. The population was 3,353 at the 2010 census, up from 2,928 at the 2000 census.

Etymology 

The community was formerly named Kelsey, Kelsey Creek, Kelsey Town, Peartown, and Uncle Sam.  The place was originally called Kelsey Town in honor of Andrew Kelsey, the first European-American settler in Lake County. Kelsey Creek, which runs through the town, is also named after Kelsey. Andrew Kelsey was killed in 1850 in an uprising against him by a band of native Pomo people whom Kelsey had enslaved. This episode ended with the Bloody Island Massacre. The place was called Uncle Sam after Mount Uncle Sam (referred to as Mount Konocti). The Uncle Sam post office opened in 1858 and changed its name to Kelseyville in 1882.

History 

In the centuries before Europeans arrived, the Eastern Pomo and Clear Lake Wappo people lived along the shores of Clear Lake. In addition to the plentiful fish caught in the lake and streams, they hunted waterfowl and gathered berries, seeds, clover and acorn. The Pomo and Wappo built homes and canoes of tule reeds found at the lakeshore.
Charles Stone and Andrew Kelsey were reportedly the first Anglo-American colonists in the region arriving in the fall of 1847 to graze cattle and horses purchased from Mexican landholder Salvador Vallejo. This was known as Big Valley Ranch. Stone and Kelsey enslaved the Pomo and Wappo people, forcing them to work under threat of torture and death. Many native people died of starvation and neglect. Stone and Kelsey were also known to rape native women and girls.
Kelseyville became the first white settlement in Lake County. The first blacksmith shop was opened by a blacksmith named Benham in 1857. It was not until 1864 that a second business was opened, a store owned by T. F. Fall. That same year, another general store and a boarding house was opened by Rosenbreau and Pace.

Geography 

The census district also includes Soda Bay and Riviera Heights, located on the northern slope of Mt. Konocti.

Demographics

2010
The 2010 United States Census reported that Kelseyville had a population of 3,353. The racial makeup of Kelseyville was 2,213 (66.0%) White, 22 (0.7%) African American, 51 (1.5%) Native American, 32 (1.0%) Asian, 2 (0.1%) Pacific Islander, 888 (26.5%) from other races, and 145 (4.3%) from two or more races. Hispanic or Latino of any race were 1,337 persons (39.9%).

The Census reported that 3,349 people (99.9% of the population) lived in households, 4 (0.1%) lived in non-institutionalized group quarters, and 0 (0%) were institutionalized.

There were 1,224 households, out of which 438 (35.8%) had children under the age of 18 living in them, 574 (46.9%) were opposite-sex married couples living together, 173 (14.1%) had a female householder with no husband present, 75 (6.1%) had a male householder with no wife present.  There were 80 (6.5%) unmarried opposite-sex partnerships, and 13 (1.1%) same-sex married couples or partnerships. 323 households (26.4%) were made up of individuals, and 163 (13.3%) had someone living alone who was 65 years of age or older. The average household size was 2.74.  There were 822 families (67.2% of all households); the average family size was 3.31.

The population was spread out, with 883 people (26.3%) under the age of 18, 298 people (8.9%) aged 18 to 24, 783 people (23.4%) aged 25 to 44, 912 people (27.2%) aged 45 to 64, and 477 people (14.2%) who were 65 years of age or older.  The median age was 38.0 years. For every 100 females, there were 101.3 males.  For every 100 females age 18 and over, there were 98.2 males.

The homeowner vacancy rate was 1.7%; the rental vacancy rate was 7.0%.  1,992 people (59.4% of the population) lived in owner-occupied housing units and 1,357 people (40.5%) lived in rental housing units.

2000
As of the census of 2000, there were 2,928 people, 1,095 households, and 724 families residing in the CDP. The racial makeup of the CDP was 76.98% White, 0.14% Black or African American, 2.66% Native American, 0.89% Asian, 14.58% from other races, and 4.75% from two or more races.  28.76% of the population were Hispanic or Latino of any race.

There were 1,095 households, out of which 33.7% had children under the age of 18 living with them, 46.9% were married couples living together, 14.8% had a female householder with no husband present, and 33.8% were non-families. 27.6% of all households were made up of individuals, and 15.8% had someone living alone who was 65 years of age or older.  The average household size was 2.66 and the average family size was 3.24.

In the CDP, the population was spread out, with 28.4% under the age of 18, 7.5% from 18 to 24, 26.7% from 25 to 44, 20.6% from 45 to 64, and 16.8% who were 65 years of age or older.  The median age was 37 years. For every 100 females, there were 98.0 males.  For every 100 females age 18 and over, there were 93.8 males.

The median income for a household in the CDP was $24,363, and the median income for a family was $28,958. Males had a median income of $26,758 versus $20,036 for females. The per capita income for the CDP was $15,651.  About 12.8% of families and 15.3% of the population were below the poverty line, including 17.7% of those under age 18 and 11.1% of those age 65 or over.

Economy 

Kelseyville is part of the North Coast American Viticultural Area. Wine tasting rooms and a brewpub are located in downtown Kelseyville.

Governance

Attractions

Stone and Kelsey Home 

Charles Stone and Andy Kelsey built a home in the 19th century at Main St. and Bell Hill Rd. They bought the property from Salvador Vallejo. Local Native Americans were enslaved to build the home. In the fall of 1849, these native people revolted and killed Stone and Kelsey, who are buried at the former site of the home. It is designated as California Historical Landmark No. 426.

Media

The first newspaper in Kelseyville was The New Era, published in 1890. In 1901, The Kelseyville Sun was started by McEwen & McEwen. In 1912, they sold The Sun to E. E. Bryant.

References

External links
 Community profile
 Kelseyville California Resource Guide

Census-designated places in Lake County, California
Census-designated places in California